The Isuzu Turquoise, known as Turkuaz in Turkey, is a 26/31 seater intercity midibus produced by Anadolu Isuzu. For the 31 seater, it was renamed the Euro Turquoise. It is powered by the 5.2L 4HK1E6C engine that produces 190 hp and 510 Nm of torque. The standard transmission is an Isuzu MZZ-6 6-speed manual while the NESS 6-speed automated manual became available as an option.

Midibuses
Intercity buses
Isuzu buses